
Open Network Computing (ONC) Remote Procedure Call (RPC), commonly known as Sun RPC is a remote procedure call system. ONC was originally developed by Sun Microsystems in the 1980s as part of their Network File System project.

ONC is based on calling conventions used in Unix and the C programming language. It serializes data using the External Data Representation (XDR), which has also found some use to encode and decode data in files that are to be accessed on more than one platform. ONC then delivers the XDR payload using either UDP or TCP. Access to RPC services on a machine are provided via a port mapper that listens for queries on a well-known port (number 111) over UDP and TCP.

ONC RPC was described in RFC 1831, published in 1995. RFC 5531, published in 2009, is the current version. Authentication mechanisms used by ONC RPC are described in RFC 2695, RFC 2203, and RFC 2623.

Implementations of ONC RPC exist in most Unix-like systems. Microsoft supplies an implementation for Windows in their Microsoft Windows Services for UNIX product; in addition, a number of third-party implementation of ONC RPC for Windows exist, including versions for C/C++, Java, and .NET (see external links).

In 2009, Sun relicensed the ONC RPC code under the standard 3-clause BSD license and then reconfirmed by Oracle Corporation in 2010 following confusion about the scope of the relicensing.

ONC is considered "lean and mean", but has limited appeal as a generalized RPC system for WANs or heterogeneous environments. Systems such as DCE, CORBA and SOAP are generally used in this wider role.

See also
XDR - The grammar defined in RFC 1831 is a small extension of the XDR grammar defined in RFC 4506
DCE
XML-RPC

References

Notes

External links
RFC 1050 - Specifies version 1 of ONC RPC
RFC 5531 - Specifies version 2 of ONC RPC
Remote Procedure Calls (RPC) — A tutorial on ONC RPC by Dr Dave Marshall of Cardiff University
Introduction to RPC Programming — A developer's introduction to RPC and XDR, from SGI IRIX documentation.
Sun ONC Developer's guide
Netbula's PowerRPC for Windows (ONC RPC for Windows with extended IDL)
Netbula's JRPC (ONC RPC for Java)(supports J2SE, J2ME and Android
ONC/RPC Implementation of the University of Aachen (Germany)
Remote Tea (LGPL Java Implementation)
Remote Tea .Net (LGPL C# Implementation)
Distinct Corporation's ONC RPC for Windows
Linux Journal article on ONC RPC
Java NIO based ONC RPC library 

Application layer protocols
Internet Standards
Remote procedure call
Sun Microsystems software
Unix software